Johanna Parker Appel is an American actress. She is married to Eric Appel, a writer and director at the popular comedy website, Funny or Die.

Johanna graduated from Syracuse University with a BFA in acting and is trained in improvisational comedy at the Upright Citizens Brigade Theatre.  She has appeared on the CBS Network's Criminal Minds and played the titular role in the short film, The Broken Heart of Gnocchi Bolognese.

She grew up near Saratoga Springs, New York and at one point wanted to be a dancer.

References

External links
 Official Site 
 

Living people
American television actresses
Syracuse University College of Visual and Performing Arts alumni
21st-century American actresses
American film actresses
Audiobook narrators
Year of birth missing (living people)
People from Saratoga Springs, New York